Olivia Sandoval is an American actress, best known for her role as Winnie Lopez, a St. Cloud police officer in Fargo.

She is the daughter of character actor Miguel Sandoval and played his daughter in the television series Medium.

Selected filmography
Repo Chick (2009)
A Simple Favor (2018)

Selected television
Medium (2007 and 2010)
Fargo (2017)
Modern Family (2017)
The Real O'Neals (2017)
Corporate (2019)
Lodge 49 (2019)

References

External links

Living people
American film actresses
American actresses of Mexican descent
American television actresses
Hispanic and Latino American actresses
Year of birth missing (living people)
21st-century American women